Weighted vests are used in:
fitness training, see Weighted clothing#Vests
therapy, see Weighted vests for children